Falconer is a Scottish surname, either a sept of Clan Keith or a clan on its own, having as crest an angel in a praying posture or, within an orle of laurel proper, as motto VIVE UT VIVAS ("Live that you may have life") but without a chief, being merely an armigerous clan. It is an Anglicized version of the Old French Faulconnier, the name being derived from the occupational name for a trainer of falcons. It can also be used as a first name or as a middle name.

People with the surname 
 Alex Falconer, Scottish politician
 Algernon Keith-Falconer, 9th Earl of Kintore (1852–1930), brother of Ion Keith Falconer, British politician and colonial governor
 Brian Falconer (born 1933), Australian rules footballer
 Charles Falconer, Baron Falconer of Thoroton (born 1951), British lawyer and politician 
 Colin Falconer (disambiguation), several people 
 Colin Falconer (bishop) (1623–1686), Scottish bishop
 Colin Falconer (writer) (born 1953), English novelist
 Daniel Falconer, prop designer
 Sir David Falconer (1640–1685), Scottish judge
 Deborah Falconer (born 1965), American actress and musician
 Delia Falconer (born 1966), Australian novelist
 Doug Falconer (Canadian football) (1952–2021), Canadian professional football player
 Douglas Scott Falconer, British quantitative geneticist
Douglas Falconer (judge) (1914–2007), British judge
 Duncan Falconer, British commando and author
 Earl Falconer (born 1959), British bass player, member of UB40
 Edmund Falconer (1814–1879), writer and actor
 Elizabeth Falconer (born 1956), American koto player
 Etta Zuber Falconer (1933–2002), American educator and mathematician
 George Falconer (1946–2013), Scottish footballer
 Hugh Falconer  (1808–1865), Scottish palaeontologist, geologist and botanist
 Ian Falconer (born 1959), American illustrator and children's book author
 Ion Keith Falconer (1856–1887), brother of Algernon Keith-Falconer, 9th Earl of Kintore, missionary and Arabic scholar
 Jacob Falconer (1869–1928), American representative
 Jenni Falconer (born 1976), British television presenter
 John Falconer (disambiguation), multiple people 
 John Falconer, character in On the Run (novel series)
 John Falconer (actor), played in The Pied Piper (1972 film)
 John Falconer (bishop) (ca. 1660–1723), Prelate of the Scottish Episcopal Church
 John Falconer (footballer) (1902–1982), Scottish footballer
 John Falconer (Jesuit) (1577–1656), English Jesuit
 John Falconer (merchant) (fl. 1547), English merchant and botanist
 John Falconer (MP), Member of Parliament for Kincardineshire
 John Falconer (poker player) (born c. 1955), British poker player
 John A. Falconer (1844–1900), soldier in the American Civil War
 John Downie Falconer (1876–1947), Scottish geologist and geographer
 John Ireland Falconer (1879–1954), Lord Provost of Edinburgh
 John Mackie Falconer (1820–1903), etcher, painter and watercolourist
 Kenneth Falconer (mathematician) (born 1952), British mathematician
 Kenneth Falconer, pen name of Cyril M. Kornbluth (1923–1958), American science fiction author 
 Kyle Falconer (born 1987), Scottish singer
 Pablo Falconer, British reggae producer
 Peter Falconer (born 1943), Australian politician
 Reid Falconer (born 1956), American politician
 Robert Falconer (1867–1943), Canadian academic
 Thomas Falconer (1805–1882), English lawyer and traveller
 William Falconer (disambiguation), multiple people 
William Falconer, 6th Lord Falconer of Halkerton (1712–1776), English aristocrat
William Falconer (bishop) (1707–1784), Scottish clergyman
William Falconer (poet) (1732–1769), Scottish poet
William Falconer (translator) (1801–1885), English clergymen and academic
William Falconer (writer) (1744–1824), English physician and Fellow of the Royal Society
 Willie Falconer (born 1966), Scottish footballer

People with the first or middle name
 Angus Falconer Douglas-Hamilton (1863–1915), Scottish military officer
 David Falconer Wells (born 1939), professor of theology
 Falconer Madan (1851–1935), British librarian
 Hardy Falconer Parsons (1897–1917), British military officer
 Lyall Falconer Howard (1896–1955), Australian war veteran and businessman
 James Falconer Wilson (1828–1895), American congressman
 Keith Falconer Fletcher (1900–1987), American book dealer
 Paul Falconer Poole (1806–1879), English painter

Fictional characters with the surname
 Quellcrist Falconer, a character of Richard Morgan's Takeshi Kovacs series

See also
 Falconer (disambiguation)
 Falkner (disambiguation)
 Faulkner (surname)
Faulconer (surname)
 Faulknor (disambiguation)
 Fawkner (disambiguation)

English-language surnames
Occupational surnames
English-language occupational surnames